Rénhòu (仁厚) may refer to:

 Renhou, Yulin, Guangxi, town in Yuzhou District, Yulin, Guangxi, China
 Renhou, Tang County, town in Hebei, China

Renhou may refer to: Renhō